The Sri Lanka cricket team has reached the World Cup final three times. Winning in 1996 under the leadership of Arjuna Ranatunga and finishing as runners-up in the 2007 & 2011 World Cups. Sri Lanka has also reached the Semi Final at the 2003 World Cup and the Quarter Final at the 2015 World Cup.

Cricket World Cup Records

By Tournament

Team wise record

References

External links

History of the Cricket World Cup
World Cup